Gerd May (born 3 June 1953) is a German fencer. He competed in the team sabre event for East Germany at the 1980 Summer Olympics.

References

1953 births
Living people
German male fencers
Olympic fencers of East Germany
Fencers at the 1980 Summer Olympics
Sportspeople from Rostock